The 2009–10 Orlando Magic season was the 21st season of the franchise in the National Basketball Association (NBA). The Magic were coming off of an NBA Finals defeat to the Los Angeles Lakers in five games. It was also the Magic's last season having the Amway Arena as their home arena. The Magic would match their record from last season. The Magic had the fourth best team offensive rating in the NBA.

In the playoffs, the Magic swept the Charlotte Bobcats in four games in the First Round, swept the Atlanta Hawks in four games in the Semi-finals, before losing to the Boston Celtics (the team that the Magic defeated in last season's Conference Semifinals in seven games) in six games in the Conference Finals in which the Magic were favored to beat. The Celtics would go on to lose to the Lakers in the Finals in seven games in a rematch from 2008 in which the Celtics won in six games.

Key dates
June 25 – The 2009 NBA draft took place in New York City.
July 8 – The free agency period started.
October 28 – The Magic began the season with a game against the Philadelphia 76ers.
November 16 – Rashard Lewis made his season debut after serving a 10-game suspension for testing positive for DHEA, a banned substance.
November 17 – It was announced that Jameer Nelson needed surgery after injuring his knee in the previous night's game.
December 21 – Nelson returned from his injury.
January 21 – Dwight Howard was named the starting center for the Eastern Conference in the 2010 NBA All-Star Game.
January 31 – Stan Van Gundy was named the coach of the East's all-stars in the 2010 NBA All-Star Game.
March 3 – The Magic clinched their third consecutive winning season with a win over the Golden State Warriors.
March 16 – By virtue of the Charlotte Bobcats losing that night, the Magic clinched a playoff berth.
April 6 – By virtue of the Atlanta Hawks losing that night, the Magic clinched their third consecutive Southeast Division title.
April 14 – The regular season ended. The Magic finished with the same win–loss record as the previous season.
April 20 – Dwight Howard was awarded the NBA Defensive Player of the Year Award for the second consecutive season.
April 26 – The Magic won their first round series in the playoffs by sweeping the Charlotte Bobcats. It was the first sweep of a 7-game series for the Magic in franchise history.
May 10 – The Magic completed a sweep of the Atlanta Hawks in the conference semi-finals.
May 28 – After losing the first three games of the series, the Magic won the next two before losing Game 6 on the road against the Boston Celtics.

Summary

NBA Draft 2009

As a result of previous trades made by the Orlando Magic, they did not have any draft choices. However, the NBA still had Adidas make a Draft Cap, which would have been given to a potential draft choice. The hat was available for public purchase on the NBA's official webstore.

Transactions
The Magic have been involved in the following transactions during the 2009–10 season.

Trades

Free agents acquired

Players re-signed

Miscellaneous

|-

Roster

Preseason

Regular season

Standings

z – clinched home court advantage through NBA Finals
y – clinched division title
x – clinched playoff spot

Record vs. opponents

Game log

|- bgcolor="#bbffbb"
| 1
| October 28
| Philadelphia
| 
| Dwight Howard (26)
| Dwight Howard (15)
| Jameer Nelson (6)
| Amway Arena17,461
| 1–0
|- bgcolor="#bbffbb"
| 2
| October 30
| @ New Jersey
| 
| Dwight Howard (20)
| Dwight Howard (22)
| Jason Williams (8)
| Izod Center17,525
| 2–0

|- bgcolor="#bbffbb"
| 3
| November 1
| @ Toronto
| 
| Jameer Nelson (30)
| Dwight Howard (11)
| Jameer Nelson, JJ Redick (5)
| Air Canada Centre18,147
| 3–0
|- bgcolor="#ffcccc"
| 4
| November 3
| @ Detroit
| 
| Vince Carter (15)
| Matt Barnes, Marcin Gortat (7)
| Jameer Nelson (6)
| The Palace of Auburn Hills15,487
| 3-1
|- bgcolor="#bbffbb"
| 5
| November 4
| Phoenix
| 
| Dwight Howard (25)
| Matt Barnes (11)
| Jameer Nelson (10)
| Amway Arena17,461
| 4–1
|- bgcolor="#bbffbb"
| 6
| November 6
| Detroit
| 
| Dwight Howard (22)
| Dwight Howard (12)
| Jameer Nelson (8)
| Amway Arena17,461
| 5–1
|- bgcolor="#ffcccc"
| 7
| November 8
| @ Oklahoma City
| 
| Dwight Howard (20)
| Dwight Howard (7)
| Jason Williams (5)
| Ford Center18,203
| 5–2
|- bgcolor="#bbffbb"
| 8
| November 10
| @ Charlotte
| 
| Vince Carter, Dwight Howard (15)
| Dwight Howard (10)
| Dwight Howard (6)
| Time Warner Cable Arena13,415
| 6–2
|- bgcolor="#ffcccc"
| 9
| November 11
| Cleveland
| 
| Vince Carter (29)
| Marcin Gortat (8)
| Jameer Nelson (5)
| Amway Arena17,461
| 6–3
|- bgcolor="#bbffbb"
| 10
| November 13
| New Jersey
| 
| Dwight Howard (26)
| Matt Barnes (13)
| Matt Barnes (5)
| Amway Arena17,461
| 7–3
|- bgcolor="#bbffbb"
| 11
| November 16
| Charlotte
| 
| Jameer Nelson (16)
| Dwight Howard (11)
| Jameer Nelson (5)
| Amway Arena17,461
| 8–3
|- bgcolor="#bbffbb"
| 12
| November 18
| Oklahoma City
| 
| Vince Carter (18)
| Dwight Howard, Rashard Lewis (10)
| Rashard Lewis (9)
| Amway Arena17,461
| 9–3
|- bgcolor="#bbffbb"
| 13
| November 20
| @ Boston
| 
| Vince Carter (26)
| Dwight Howard (15)
| Vince Carter, Jason Williams (6)
| TD Garden18,624
| 10–3
|- bgcolor="#bbffbb"
| 14
| November 22
| @ Toronto
| 
| Vince Carter (24)
| Dwight Howard (12)
| JJ Redick (5)
| Air Canada Centre17,233
| 11–3
|- bgcolor="#ffcccc"
| 15
| November 25
| Miami
| 
| Jason Williams (25)
| Dwight Howard (16)
| Jason Williams (8)
| Amway Arena17,461
| 11–4
|- bgcolor="#bbffbb"
| 16
| November 26
| @ Atlanta
| 
| Dwight Howard (22)
| Dwight Howard (17)
| Matt Barnes, Dwight Howard, Anthony Johnson, Jason Williams  (3)
| Philips Arena19,193
| 12–4
|- bgcolor="#bbffbb"
| 17
| November 28
| @ Milwaukee
|  
| Dwight Howard, Vince Carter  (25)
| Dwight Howard (20)
| Jason Williams (10)
| Bradley Center16,128 
| 13–4
|- bgcolor="#bbffbb"
| 18
| November 29
| @ New York
| 
| Dwight Howard, Rashard Lewis (18)
| Dwight Howard (12)
| Jason Williams (7)
| Madison Square Garden18,861
| 14–4

|- bgcolor="#bbffbb"
| 19
| December 2
| New York
| 
| Rashard Lewis (20)
| Rashard Lewis (11)
| Vince Carter, Jason Williams (5)
| Amway Arena17,461
| 15–4
|- bgcolor="#bbffbb"
| 20
| December 5
| @ Golden State
| 
| Vince Carter (27)
| Dwight Howard (8)
| Jason Williams (8)
| Oracle Arena19,054
| 16–4
|- bgcolor="#bbffbb"
| 21
| December 8
| @ L.A. Clippers
| 
| Dwight Howard (25)
| Dwight Howard (11)
| Dwight Howard (5)
| Staples Center16,750
| 17–4
|- bgcolor="#ffcccc"
| 22
| December 10
| @ Utah
| 
| Vince Carter (34)
| Dwight Howard (10)
| Jason Williams (5)
| EnergySolutions Arena18,735
| 17–5
|- bgcolor="#ffcccc"
| 23
| December 11
| @ Phoenix
| 
| Rashard Lewis (24)
| Dwight Howard (18)
| Vince Carter, Jason Williams (6)
| US Airways Center18,216
| 17–6
|- bgcolor="#bbffbb"
| 24
| December 14
| Indiana
| 
| Vince Carter (28)
| Dwight Howard (23)
| Anthony Johnson (7)
| Amway Arena17,461
| 18–6
|- bgcolor="#bbffbb"
| 25
| December 16
| Toronto
| 
| Rashard Lewis (21)
| Dwight Howard (14)
| Vince Carter, Jason Williams (7)
| Amway Arena17,461
| 19–6
|- bgcolor="#ffcccc"
| 26
| December 17
| @ Miami
| 
| Dwight Howard (17)
| Dwight Howard (14)
| Anthony Johnson (5)
| American Airlines Arena18,303
| 19–7
|- bgcolor="#bbffbb"
| 27
| December 19
| Portland
| 
| Rashard Lewis (15)
| Dwight Howard (20)
| Vince Carter, Anthony Johnson (3)
| Amway Arena17,461
| 20–7
|- bgcolor="#bbffbb"
| 28
| December 21
| Utah
| 
| Dwight Howard (21)
| Vince Carter, Dwight Howard (9)
| Jason Williams (4)
| Amway Arena17,461
| 21–7
|- bgcolor="#bbffbb"
| 29
| December 23
| Houston
| 
| Vince Carter (18)
| Dwight Howard (20)
| Jason Williams (6)
| Amway Arena17,461
| 22–7
|- bgcolor="#ffcccc"
| 30
| December 25
| Boston
| 
| Vince Carter (27)
| Dwight Howard (20)
| Jameer Nelson (3)
| Amway Arena17,461
| 22–8
|- bgcolor="#bbffbb"
| 31
| December 30
| Milwaukee
| 
| Vince Carter (25)
| Dwight Howard (10)
| Jason Williams (7)
| Amway Arena17,461
| 23–8

|- bgcolor="#bbffbb"
| 32
| January 1
| @ Minnesota
| 
| Rashard Lewis (21)
| Dwight Howard (15)
| Vince Carter, Jameer Nelson (6)
| Target Center17,065
| 24–8
|- bgcolor="#ffcccc"
| 33
| January 2
| @ Chicago
| 
| Matt Barnes (23)
| Dwight Howard (12)
| Jameer Nelson (10)
| United Center21,162
| 24–9
|- bgcolor="#ffcccc"
| 34
| January 5
| @ Indiana
| 
| Jameer Nelson, Mickaël Piétrus (16)
| Dwight Howard (15)
| Jameer Nelson (4)
| Conseco Fieldhouse11,119
| 24–10
|- bgcolor="#ffcccc"
| 35
| January 6
| Toronto
| 
| Rashard Lewis (24)
| Dwight Howard (12)
| Jameer Nelson (8)
| Amway Arena17,461
| 24–11
|- bgcolor="#ffcccc"
| 36
| January 8
| @ Washington
| 
| Dwight Howard (23)
| Dwight Howard (11)
| Jameer Nelson (5)
| Verizon Center20,173
| 24–12
|- bgcolor="#bbffbb"
| 37
| January 9
| Atlanta
| 
| Matt Barnes (18)
| Marcin Gortat (12)
| Jason Williams (6)
| Amway Arena17,461
| 25–12
|- bgcolor="#bbffbb"
| 38
| January 12
| @ Sacramento
| 
| Dwight Howard (30)
| Dwight Howard (16)
| Jason Williams (6)
| ARCO Arena14,426
| 26–12
|- bgcolor="#ffcccc"
| 39
| January 13
| @ Denver
| 
| Matt Barnes (28)
| Dwight Howard (13)
| Jason Williams (4)
| Pepsi Center18,475
| 26–13
|- bgcolor="#ffcccc"
| 40
| January 15
| @ Portland
| 
| Rashard Lewis, Jameer Nelson (15)
| Dwight Howard (11)
| Jason Williams (4)
| Rose Garden20,650
| 26–14
|- bgcolor="#ffcccc"
| 41
| January 18
| @ L.A. Lakers
| 
| Dwight Howard (24)
| Dwight Howard (12)
| Jameer Nelson (8)
| Staples Center18,997
| 26–15
|- bgcolor="#bbffbb"
| 42
| January 20
| Indiana
| 
| Dwight Howard (32)
| Matt Barnes (16)
| Jason Williams (9)
| Amway Arena17,461
| 27–15
|- bgcolor="#bbffbb"
| 43
| January 22
| Sacramento
| 
| Dwight Howard (19)
| Dwight Howard (15)
| Jameer Nelson (7)
| Amway Arena17,461
| 28–15
|- bgcolor="#bbffbb"
| 44
| January 23
| @ Charlotte
| 
| Vince Carter, Jameer Nelson (21)
| Dwight Howard (20)
| Jameer Nelson (7)
| Time Warner Cable Arena19,277
| 29–15
|- bgcolor="#ffcccc"
| 45
| January 25
| @ Memphis
| 
| Dwight Howard (27)
| Dwight Howard (15)
| Jason Williams (4)
| FedExForum12,273
| 29–16
|- bgcolor="#bbffbb"
| 46
| January 28
| Boston
| 
| Rashard Lewis (23)
| Dwight Howard (10)
| Vince Carter, Jameer Nelson, Jason Williams (2)
| Amway Arena17,461
| 30–16
|- bgcolor="#bbffbb"
| 47
| January 30
| Atlanta
| 
| Dwight Howard (31)
| Dwight Howard (19)
| JJ Redick (7)
| Amway Arena17,461
| 31–16
|- bgcolor="#bbffbb"
| 48
| January 31
| @ Detroit
| 
| JJ Redick (17)
| Dwight Howard (15)
| Rashard Lewis, Jason Williams (4)
| The Palace of Auburn Hills19,107
| 32–16

|- bgcolor="#bbffbb"
| 49
| February 2
| Milwaukee
| 
| Dwight Howard (22)
| Dwight Howard (11)
| Vince Carter (7)
| Amway Arena17,461
| 33–16
|- bgcolor="#ffcccc"
| 50
| February 5
| Washington
| 
| Vince Carter (21)
| Dwight Howard (18)
| Jameer Nelson (5)
| Amway Arena17,461
| 33–17
|- bgcolor="#bbffbb"
| 51
| February 7
| @ Boston
| 
| Vince Carter (20)
| Dwight Howard (13)
| Jameer Nelson (4)
| TD Garden18,264
| 34–17
|- bgcolor="#bbffbb"
| 52
| February 8
| New Orleans
| 
| Vince Carter (48)
| Dwight Howard (12)
| Jameer Nelson (10)
| Amway Arena17,461
| 35–17
|- bgcolor="#bbffbb"
| 53
| February 10
| @ Chicago
| 
| Dwight Howard (18)
| Dwight Howard (14)
| Jameer Nelson (6)
| United Center21,566
| 36–17
|- bgcolor="#ffcccc"
| 54
| February 11
| @ Cleveland
| 
| Dwight Howard, Rashard Lewis (19)
| Dwight Howard (11)
| Jameer Nelson (5)
| Quicken Loans Arena20,562
| 36–18
|- align="center"
|colspan="9" bgcolor="#bbcaff"|All-Star Break
|- bgcolor="#bbffbb"
| 55
| February 17
| Detroit
| 
| Dwight Howard (33)
| Dwight Howard (17)
| Jameer Nelson (9)
| Amway Arena17,461
| 37–18
|- bgcolor="#ffcccc"
| 56
| February 19
| Dallas
| 
| Dwight Howard (29)
| Dwight Howard (16)
| Jameer Nelson (6)
| Amway Arena17,461
| 37–19
|- bgcolor="#bbffbb"
| 57
| February 21
| Cleveland
| 
| Dwight Howard (22)
| Dwight Howard (16)
| Jameer Nelson (5)
| Amway Arena17,461
| 38–19
|- bgcolor="#bbffbb"
| 58
| February 24
| @ Houston
| 
| Dwight Howard (30)
| Dwight Howard (16)
| Jameer Nelson (9)
| Toyota Center15,749
| 39–19
|- bgcolor="#ffcccc"
| 59
| February 26
| @ New Orleans
| 
| Dwight Howard (26)
| Dwight Howard (10)
| Jameer Nelson (11)
| New Orleans Arena16,954
| 39–20
|- bgcolor="#bbffbb"
| 60
| February 28
| Miami
| 
| Rashard Lewis (22)
| Matt Barnes (8)
| Jameer Nelson (4)
| Amway Arena17,461
| 40–20

|- bgcolor="#bbffbb"
| 61
| March 1
| @ Philadelphia
| 
| Jameer Nelson (22)
| Vince Carter (7)
| Jameer Nelson (10)
| Wachovia Center15,817
| 41–20
|- bgcolor="#bbffbb"
| 62
| March 3
| Golden State
| 
| Dwight Howard (28)
| Dwight Howard (12)
| Jameer Nelson (4)
| Amway Arena17,461
| 42–20
|- bgcolor="#bbffbb"
| 63
| March 5
| @ New Jersey
| 
| Matt Barnes (16)
| Dwight Howard (16)
| Jameer Nelson (8)
| Izod Center15,320
| 43–20
|- bgcolor="#bbffbb"
| 64
| March 7
| L.A. Lakers
| 
| Vince Carter (25)
| Dwight Howard (16)
| Jameer Nelson (7)
| Amway Arena17,461
| 44–20
|- bgcolor="#bbffbb"
| 65
| March 9
| L.A. Clippers
| 
| Dwight Howard (22)
| Dwight Howard (15)
| Jameer Nelson (8)
| Amway Arena17,461
| 45–20
|- bgcolor="#bbffbb"
| 66
| March 11
| Chicago
| 
| Vince Carter (23)
| Marcin Gortat (11)
| JJ Redick, Jason Williams (4)
| Amway Arena17,461
| 46–20
|- bgcolor="#bbffbb"
| 67
| March 13
| @ Washington
| 
| Dwight Howard (28)
| Dwight Howard (15)
| Jameer Nelson (8)
| Verizon Center20,173
| 47–20
|- bgcolor="#ffcccc"
| 68
| March 14
| Charlotte
| 
| Dwight Howard (27)
| Dwight Howard (16)
| Vince Carter (6)
| Amway Arena17,461
| 47–21
|- bgcolor="#bbffbb"
| 69
| March 17
| San Antonio
| 
| Vince Carter (24)
| Marcin Gortat (10)
| Vince Carter (8)
| Amway Arena17,461
| 48–21
|- bgcolor="#bbffbb"
| 70
| March 18
| @ Miami
| 
| Vince Carter (27)
| Dwight Howard, Rashard Lewis (11)
| Vince Carter (6)
| American Airlines Arena18,874
| 49–21
|- bgcolor="#bbffbb"
| 71
| March 22
| @ Philadelphia
| 
| Rashard Lewis (24)
| Dwight Howard (15)
| Jameer Nelson (6)
| Wachovia Center13,995
| 50–21
|- bgcolor="#ffcccc"
| 72
| March 24
| @ Atlanta
| 
| Jameer Nelson (20)
| Dwight Howard (24)
| Jameer Nelson (8)
| Philips Arena16,887
| 50–22
|- bgcolor="#bbffbb"
| 73
| March 26
| Minnesota
| 
| Dwight Howard (24)
| Dwight Howard (19)
| Jameer Nelson (7)
| Amway Arena17,461
| 51–22
|- bgcolor="#bbffbb" 
| 74
| March 28
| Denver
| 
| JJ Redick (23)
| Dwight Howard (11)
| JJ Redick (8)
| Amway Arena17,461
| 52–22

|- bgcolor="#bbffbb"
| 75
| April 1
| @ Dallas
| 
| Mickaël Piétrus (24)
| Dwight Howard (20)
| Jameer Nelson (7)
| American Airlines Center19,965
| 53–22
|- bgcolor="#ffcccc"
| 76
| April 2
| @ San Antonio
| 
| Rashard Lewis, Mickaël Piétrus (18)
| Marcin Gortat (7)
| Jameer Nelson (6)
| AT&T Center18,581
| 53–23
|- bgcolor="#bbffbb"
| 77
| April 4
| Memphis
| 
| Vince Carter (26)
| Dwight Howard (11)
| Vince Carter (6)
| Amway Arena17,461
| 54–23
|- bgcolor="#bbffbb"
| 78
| April 7
| Washington
| 
| Dwight Howard (17)
| Dwight Howard (10)
| Jameer Nelson (6)
| Amway Arena17,461
| 55–23
|- bgcolor="#bbffbb"
| 79
| April 9
| New York
| 
| Vince Carter, Dwight Howard (25)
| Dwight Howard (13)
| Vince Carter, Jameer Nelson, Jason Williams (5)
| Amway Arena17,461
| 56–23
|- bgcolor="#bbffbb"
| 80
| April 11
| @ Cleveland
| 
| Dwight Howard (22)
| Dwight Howard (13)
| Jameer Nelson (8)
| Quicken Loans Arena20,562
| 57–23
|- bgcolor="#bbffbb"
| 81
| April 12
| @ Indiana
| 
| Vince Carter (21)
| Matt Barnes, Dwight Howard (11)
| Jameer Nelson (8)
| Conseco Fieldhouse18,165
| 58–23
|- bgcolor="#bbffbb"
| 82
| April 14
| Philadelphia
| 
| Jameer Nelson (21)
| Dwight Howard (12)
| Vince Carter (6)
| Amway Arena17,461
| 59–23

Playoffs

Game log

|- bgcolor="#bbffbb"
| 1
| April 18
| Charlotte
| 
| Jameer Nelson (32)
| Dwight Howard (7)
| Jameer Nelson (6)
| Amway Arena17,461
| 1–0
|- bgcolor="#bbffbb"
| 2
| April 21
| Charlotte
| 
| Vince Carter (19)
| Dwight Howard (9)
| Jameer Nelson (5)
| Amway Arena17,461
| 2–0
|- bgcolor="#bbffbb"
| 3
| April 24
| @ Charlotte
| 
| Jameer Nelson (32)
| Marcin Gortat, Dwight Howard (8)
| Matt Barnes, Dwight Howard, Rashard Lewis, Jameer Nelson (3)
| Time Warner Cable Arena19,596
| 3–0
|- bgcolor="#bbffbb" 
| 4
| April 26
| @ Charlotte
| 
| Vince Carter (21)
| Dwight Howard (13)
| Vince Carter, Jameer Nelson (4)
| Time Warner Cable Arena19,086
| 4–0

|- bgcolor="#bbffbb" 
| 1
| May 4
| Atlanta
| 
| Dwight Howard (21)
| Dwight Howard (12)
| Jameer Nelson (5)
| Amway Arena17,461
| 1–0
|- bgcolor="#bbffbb" 
| 2
| May 6
| Atlanta
| 
| Dwight Howard (29)
| Dwight Howard (17)
| Rashard Lewis, Jameer Nelson (6)
| Amway Arena17,461
| 2–0
|- bgcolor="#bbffbb"
| 3
| May 8
| @ Atlanta
| 
| Rashard Lewis (22)
| Dwight Howard (16)
| Jameer Nelson (4)
| Philips Arena18,729
| 3–0
|- bgcolor="#bbffbb"
| 4
| May 10
| @ Atlanta
|  
| Vince Carter (22)
| Ryan Anderson, Dwight Howard (8)
| Jameer Nelson (9)
| Philips Arena18,729
| 4–0

|- bgcolor="#ffcccc"
| 1
| May 16
| Boston
| 
| Vince Carter (23)
| Dwight Howard (12)
| Vince Carter, Dwight Howard, Rashard Lewis, Jameer Nelson (2)
| Amway Arena17,461
| 0–1
|- bgcolor="#ffcccc"
| 2
| May 18
| Boston
| 
| Dwight Howard (30)
| Dwight Howard (8)
| Rashard Lewis, Jameer Nelson, JJ Redick (4)
| Amway Arena17,461
| 0–2
|- bgcolor="#ffcccc"
| 3
| May 22
| @ Boston
| 
| Vince Carter, Jameer Nelson (15)
| Dwight Howard (7)
| Matt Barnes, Vince Carter, JJ Redick (2)
| TD Garden18,624
| 0–3
|- bgcolor="#bbffbb"
| 4
| May 24
| @ Boston
| 
| Dwight Howard (32)
| Dwight Howard (16)
| Jameer Nelson (9)
| TD Garden18,624
| 1–3
|- bgcolor="#bbffbb"
| 5
| May 26
| Boston
| 
| Jameer Nelson (24)
| Dwight Howard (10)
| Jameer Nelson, Jason Williams (5)
| Amway Arena17,461
| 2–3
|- bgcolor="#ffcccc"
| 6
| May 28
| @ Boston
| 
| Dwight Howard (28)
| Dwight Howard (12)
| Jameer Nelson (6)
| TD Garden18,624
| 2–4

Player statistics

Regular season

|-
| 
| 63 || 6 || 14.5 || .436 || .370 || .866 || 3.2 || 0.6 || 0.40 || 0.22 || 7.7
|-
| 
| 81 || 58 || 25.9 || .487 || .319 || .740 || 5.5 || 1.7 || 0.70 || 0.37 || 8.8
|-
| 
| 50 || 3 || 13.0 || .511 || .000 || .825 || 2.5 || 0.4 || 0.24 || 0.54 || 5.8
|-
| 
| 75 || 74 || 30.8 || .428 || .367 || .840 || 3.9 || 3.1 || 0.71 || 0.24 || 16.6
|-
| 
| 81 || 0 || 13.4 || .533 || .000 || .680 || 4.2 || 0.2 || 0.21 || 0.86 || 3.6
|-
| 
| style="background:#000000;color:#FFFFFF;"| 82 || style="background:#000000;color:#FFFFFF;"| 82 || style="background:#000000;color:#FFFFFF;"| 34.7 || style="background:#000000;color:#FFFFFF;"| .612 || .000 || .592 || style="background:#000000;color:#FFFFFF;"| 13.2 || 1.8 || 0.91 || style="background:#000000;color:#FFFFFF;"| 2.78 || style="background:#000000;color:#FFFFFF;"| 18.3
|-
| 
| 31 || 0 || 13.1 || .441 || .333 || style="background:#000000;color:#FFFFFF;"| .950 || 1.5 || 2.0 || 0.35 || 0.03 || 4.2
|-
| 
| 72 || 72 || 32.9 || .435 || .397 || .806 || 4.4 || 1.5 || style="background:#000000;color:#FFFFFF;"| 1.08 || 0.39 || 14.1
|-
| 
| 65 || 64 || 28.6 || .449 || .381 || .845 || 3.0 || style="background:#000000;color:#FFFFFF;"| 5.4 || 0.74 || 0.03 || 12.6
|-
| 
| 75 || 24 || 22.5 || .432 || .379 || .633 || 2.9 || 0.7 || 0.71 || 0.41 || 8.7
|-
| 
| style="background:#000000;color:#FFFFFF;"| 82 || 9 || 22.0 || .439 || style="background:#000000;color:#FFFFFF;"| .405 || .860 || 1.9 || 1.9 || 0.34 || 0.05 || 9.6
|-
| 
| style="background:#000000;color:#FFFFFF;"| 82 || 18 || 20.8 || .444 || .380 || .756 || 1.5 || 3.6 || 0.65 || 0.04 || 6.0
|}

Source: ESPN.com

Playoffs

|-
| 
| 9 || 0 || 9.9 || .310 || .286 || style="background:#000000;color:#FFFFFF;"| 1.000 || 3.4 || .3 || .2 || .2 || 2.6
|-
| 
| style="background:#000000;color:#FFFFFF;"| 14 || style="background:#000000;color:#FFFFFF;"| 14 || 23.3 || .400 || .375 || .850 || 4.7 || 1.4 || .7 || .2 || 6.4
|-
| 
| 7 || 0 || 6.0 || .538 || .000 || .833 || 1.1 || .1 || .0 || .0 || 2.7
|-
| 
| style="background:#000000;color:#FFFFFF;"| 14 || style="background:#000000;color:#FFFFFF;"| 14 || 34.4 || .402 || .235 || .826 || 4.2 || 2.3 || .9 || .2 || 15.5
|-
| 
| style="background:#000000;color:#FFFFFF;"| 14 || 0 || 15.1 || style="background:#000000;color:#FFFFFF;"| .654 || .000 || .727 || 4.4 || .6 || .2 || .3 || 3.0
|-
| 
| style="background:#000000;color:#FFFFFF;"| 14 || style="background:#000000;color:#FFFFFF;"| 14 || 35.5 || .614 || .000 || .519 || style="background:#000000;color:#FFFFFF;"| 11.1 || 1.4 || .8 || style="background:#000000;color:#FFFFFF;"| 3.5 || 18.1
|-
| 
| 1 || 0 || 5.0 || .500 || .000 || .000 || .0 || 2.0 || .0 || .0 || 2.0
|-
| 
| style="background:#000000;color:#FFFFFF;"| 14 || style="background:#000000;color:#FFFFFF;"| 14 || style="background:#000000;color:#FFFFFF;"| 36.6 || .462 || .373 || .800 || 5.6 || 2.3 || style="background:#000000;color:#FFFFFF;"| 1.1 || .7 || 12.9
|-
| 
| style="background:#000000;color:#FFFFFF;"| 14 || style="background:#000000;color:#FFFFFF;"| 14 || 34.2 || .479 || .393 || .823 || 3.6 || style="background:#000000;color:#FFFFFF;"| 4.8 || 1.0 || .0 || style="background:#000000;color:#FFFFFF;"| 19.0
|-
| 
| style="background:#000000;color:#FFFFFF;"| 14 || 0 || 20.1 || .438 || style="background:#000000;color:#FFFFFF;"| .459 || .667 || 1.4 || .7 || .6 || .4 || 8.4
|-
| 
| style="background:#000000;color:#FFFFFF;"| 14 || 0 || 19.2 || .423 || .429 || .857 || 1.7 || 1.4 || .7 || .0 || 7.5
|-
| 
| style="background:#000000;color:#FFFFFF;"| 14 || 0 || 13.7 || .342 || .250 || style="background:#000000;color:#FFFFFF;"| 1.000 || .8 || 1.6 || .3 || .0 || 2.6
|}

Source: ESPN.com

Awards, records and milestones

Awards and honors
Dwight Howard – Defensive Player of the Year, All-NBA 1st Team, All-Defensive 1st Team, Rebounding Champion, Blocks Champion, Field goal percentage leader, All-Star
Stan Van Gundy – All-Star East Head Coach

Player of the Week
October 27–November 1 – Dwight Howard
December 14–20 – Dwight Howard
February 15–21 – Dwight Howard
April 5–11 – Dwight Howard

Coach of the Month
October–November – Stan Van Gundy
April – Stan Van Gundy

Injuries and surgeries

Though he was not expected to get much playing time, Adonal Foyle underwent arthroscopic surgery on his right knee on October 21, a little more than a week before the start of the season. His return depends on how well his knee recovers with treatment.

Vince Carter was injured on October 30 during the second game of the season, suffering a sprained left ankle. The injury was reported as not too serious, but caused Carter to miss four of the Magic's next five games.

Ryan Anderson injured his ankle in the game against Detroit on November 3. He missed the following 4 games before returning to play against the Bobcats.

Jameer Nelson suffered a torn meniscus in his left knee during the 4th quarter of a game on November 16. The next day it was revealed that arthroscopic surgery would be required to repair the injury. He was expected to be out 4–6 weeks, but a report later in the week stated his teammates expected him to be gone for only 3 weeks. Ultimately, Nelson would return to action on December 21, five weeks to the day of his injury.

Minor League Affiliate
The Magic are affiliated with the Reno Bighorns of the D-League. They replace the Bakersfield Jam for the 2009–10 season.

References

Orlando Magic seasons
Orlando
Orlando Magic
Orlando Magic